A vagabond is a person who wanders from place to place without a permanent home or regular work.

(The) Vagabond or Vagabondage may also refer to:

Literature
Vagabond (novel), second book in The Grail Quest series of Bernard Cornwell
The Vagabond, a 1799 novel by George Walker
The Vagabond, an 1878 play by W. S. Gilbert, originally called The Ne'er-do-Weel
The Vagabond, a poem by Robert Louis Stevenson, published in Songs of Travel and Other Verses in 1896
The Vagabond (novel), a 1910 novel by Colette

Publications 
Vagabond (manga), a 1998 manga by Takehiko Inoue
Vagabond (comics), a Marvel Universe character
Vagabond (magazine), a Swedish travel magazine

Film and television
The Vagabonds (1912 film), an American silent film
The Vagabond (1916 film), a film starring Charlie Chaplin
The Vagabonds (1916 film), an Austrian silent comedy film
The Vagabonds (1937 film), a German operetta film
The Vagabonds (1939 film), a Polish film
Vagabond (1950 film), an Iranian film
Awaara (1951 film), an Indian film also known as The Vagabond
The Vagabond (1953 film), a Mexican comedy film
Vagabond (1985 film), a film by Agnès Varda
Paradesi (2013 film), an Indian Tamil language period drama film
 Le Vagabond, or The Littlest Hobo, a Canadian film and television series
Mo Amer: The Vagabond (2018), a Netflix comedy special by Mo Amer
Vagabond (TV series), a 2019 South Korean television series

Music

Bands 
Vagabond (Norwegian band), an alternative rock band fronted by Jørn Lande
Vagabond (UK band), a band from the UK
Jimmy James and the Vagabonds, featuring Jimmy James (singer) (born 1940), Jamaican soul music singer
The Four Vagabonds, commonly known as The Vagabonds.

Albums 
Vagabond (Eddi Reader album), 2014
Vagabond (Lasse Stefanz album), 2007
Vagabond, by Michale Graves
Vagabond (Spiers and Boden album)
Vagabond, by Tony Sheridan
Vagabond, by Valina
Vagabondages, 1989 progressive rock compilation by Ange
Vagabonds (Gary Louris album), 2008
Vagabonds, by Satellite Stories
Vagabonds (The Classic Crime album)
The Vagabond, by Bryn Terfel
The Vagabond, a 2005 solo album by Speech
Vagabonds of the Western World, studio album by Thin Lizzy, 1973

Songs 
"Vagabond", by Wolfmother from their self-titled album
"Vagabond", by Greenskeepers in Grand Theft Auto IV
"Vagabond", by Juliana Hatfield from the album There's Always Another Girl
"Vagabond", by MisterWives from the album Our Own House
"Vagabonds", by New Model Army from the album Thunder and Consolation
"The Vagabond", a musical setting of a Robert Louis Stevenson poem by Ralph Vaughan Williams in his song cycle Songs of Travel
"The Vagabond", by John Ireland

Other
 Julian Thomas (journalist) (1843–1896), also known as The Vagabond, English-born Australian journalist and author
Vagabond (boat), a French polar yacht
Vagabond (sailing dinghy)
Vagabond Inn, an American hotel chain
Piper PA-15 Vagabond, a civilian airplane
 Vagabonds RUFC, a rugby union club located in Douglas, Isle of Man
 The Vagabonds (club), a lunch club within the National Arts Club

See also
La Vagabonde (disambiguation)
Vagrant (disambiguation)
Wandering (disambiguation)